Dyuba-Dyuba is a 1992 Russian crime drama film directed by Aleksandr Khvan. It was entered into the 1993 Cannes Film Festival. The film won the award for Best Sound at the 1992 Nika Awards.

Plot
The action takes place in the late 1980s in the Soviet Union after the collapse. The  life of VGIK student Andrei Pletnyov (Oleg Menshikov) is going smoothly, but he commits a serious crime to get money for a jailbreak of his former lover. But their meeting after the successful escape does not bring happiness – during the years of separation they have become strangers to each other. Through the whole picture the underlying theme is a popular topic of those times – emigration to America (Andrei is planning to go there no matter what happens and offers Tatiana to do the same).

After yet another nervous breakdown, without shying away Tatiana comes to the house of her lover Kolya and gets into the hands of the police. Hopeless Andrei tries to find a way to get revenge on his opponent, he comes to him to iron out their relationship, but after getting seriously wounded with a knife, he sets off a grenade which explodes the whole apartment.

Cast
 Oleg Menshikov as Andrei Pletnyov
 Anzhela Belyanskaya as Tanya Vorobyova
 Grigori Konstantinopolsky as Viktor
 Aleksandr Tyunin as Igor
 Aleksandr Negreba as Kolya
 Viktor Terelya as Oleg
 Vladimir Golovin as guard
 Georgi Taratorkin as lawyer
 Farhad Mahmudov as Dzhanik

References

External links

1992 films
1992 crime drama films
Russian crime drama films
1990s Russian-language films
Films directed by Aleksandr Khvan